As a nickname, Goose or the Goose may refer to:

People 

 Jeff Agoos (born 1968), Swiss-born American retired soccer player
 Ida Burger, American dance hall girl and prostitute during the early 20th century, known as "Ida the Goose"
 Robert Louis Freeman Sr. (1932–2003), American lawyer and politician
 Bob Gagliano (born 1958), American former National Football League quarterback
 Paul Gaustad (born 1982), American National Hockey League player
 Jack Givens (born 1956), American retired basketball player
 Goose Gonsoulin (born 1938) American football player
 Retief Goosen (born 1969), a South African professional golfer
 Marc Goossens (born 1969), Belgian former race car driver
 Goose Goslin (1900–1971), American Major League Baseball player
 Simon Gosling (born 1969), British designer of special effects models
 Goose Gossage (born 1951), American Major League Baseball player
 Vladimir Gusev (cyclist) (born 1982), Russian road racing cyclist
 Jim Ligon (1944–2004), American basketball player
 Matt Maguire, Australian rules footballer
 Jesse Sergent (born 1988), New Zealand racing cyclist 
 Tony Siragusa (1967-2022), American National Football League player
 Goose Tatum (1921–1967), African-American star basketball player with the Harlem Globetrotters and Negro league baseball player

Others 

 Nick "Goose" Bradshaw, a character in the 1986 film Top Gun, played by Anthony Edwards
 Jim "The Goose" Goose, best friend of Max Rockatansky in the 1979 film "Mad Max", played by Steve Bisley
 Shane "Goose" Gooseman, a character in The Adventures of the Galaxy Rangers television show
 Coaltown (1945–1965), American Thoroughbred racehorse nicknamed "The Goose"
 Goose, a cat-like alien featured in the 2019 Captain Marvel movie

See also 

 Lance McCullers (born 1964), American former Major League Baseball pitcher nicknamed "Baby Goose"
 Duck (nickname)

Lists of people by nickname